The Cathedral of the Immaculate Conception is a Catholic cathedral in Crookston, Minnesota, United States. It is the seat of the Diocese of Crookston.

1990 cathedral
The present Cathedral was dedicated September 25, 1990 and is designed in the modern style.  Prominent within the cathedral is the magnificent organ which is Opus 2132 of the Reuter Organ Company of Lawrence, Kansas. It is a two-manual, 31-rank instrument that contains approximately 1789 pipes.  The cathedral's west bell tower features a shrine to the Holy Family.  The Blessed Sacrament Chapel located in the southwest corner of the church, houses the cathedral's Tabernacle, as well as the cathedral's reliquary, and shrine to Our Lady of Guadeloupe.

1912 cathedral
It replaced the previous cathedral of the same name which had been built in 1912 at the intersection of North Ash Street and Second Avenue.

The earlier Cathedral of the Immaculate Conception is unusual for having three spires on its Neo-Gothic facade, whereas most Neo-Gothic churches have one or two. Local architect Bert Keck designed the church. His design included two balconies, on the north and the south side of the church, for antiphonal choir responses.  It also has a large choir balcony in the rear of the church for the choir and organ.  Bishop Timothy J. Corbett, the first bishop of the newly formed Diocese of Crookston, organized the construction of the cathedral.  The structure was added to the National Register of Historic Places on October 1, 1989.

After the Diocese dedicated the new cathedral, it transferred ownership of the former structure to a homeless shelter which used the rectory for additional space.  The shelter removed the stained glass windows from the sanctuary and gave some to parish members, with the rest sold to provide funding for its programs.  In 2001, a windstorm caused severe damage to the remaining stained glass, causing air and rain to leak into the building.  The flat roofs of the sacristies were failing at the time of transfer and subsequently caused a lot of damage. The North Sacristy has been completely gutted, and the rest of the clean-up is scheduled for 2018 when doors can be opened again. The Prairie Skyline Foundation has drafted plans to restore the cathedral and turn it into a Community Center with arts activities and performing art space.

See also
List of Catholic cathedrals in the United States
List of cathedrals in the United States

References

External links

Cathedral website
Diocese of Crookston website

Immaculate Conception, Crookston
Churches in the Roman Catholic Diocese of Crookston
Crookston, Minnesota
Buildings and structures in Polk County, Minnesota
Modernist architecture in Minnesota
Roman Catholic churches completed in 1990
Churches on the National Register of Historic Places in Minnesota
Gothic Revival church buildings in Minnesota
1912 establishments in Minnesota
National Register of Historic Places in Polk County, Minnesota
20th-century Roman Catholic church buildings in the United States